Percy Neville Frank Mansell MBE (16 March 1920 – 9 May 1995 ) was a Rhodesian cricketer who played in thirteen Tests for South Africa from 1951 to 1955. Mansell was a bespectacled middle-order batsman, slips fieldsman, and leg-break and googly bowler who sometimes bowled medium-pace.

Background 
Born in England, Mansell moved to Bulawayo, Southern Rhodesia (now Zimbabwe) as an infant. He was educated at Milton High School and first played first-class cricket for Rhodesia at the age of 16 against Transvaal in 1936–37.

Career 
He represented Rhodesia 55 times before retiring after the 1961–62 season, having played his last match just before his 42nd birthday.

His best first-class bowling figures were 7 for 43 (13 for 120 in the match) in Rhodesia's two-run victory over the touring Surrey team in 1959–60. His two highest scores were 148 and 154, which he made in Rhodesia's two innings victories over Griqualand West in the B Section of the Currie Cup in 1955–56.

After retiring from the game he served as a cricket administrator in Rhodesia. He was awarded the MBE "for services to cricket in Southern Rhodesia" in the 1962 New Year Honours.

References

External links
 Portrait and brief biography of Percy Mansell (scroll down)
 Percy Mansell at Cricinfo
 Percy Mansell at Cricket Archive

1920 births
1995 deaths
People from Telford
Sportspeople from Shropshire
South Africa Test cricketers
South African cricketers
Rhodesia cricketers
White Rhodesian people
British emigrants to Rhodesia
Rhodesian emigrants to South Africa